Senter is a surname, and may refer to:

 Anthony Senter (born 1955), American mobster
 Darren Senter (born 1972), Australian professional rugby league footballer
 Dewitt Clinton Senter (1830-1898), American politician
 George B. Senter (1827-1870), American politician
 Henry M. Senter (1873-1934), American football player
 Josh Senter (born 1979), American screenwriter
 Leon B. Senter (1889-1965), American architect
 Lyonel Thomas Senter Jr. (born 1933), American judge
 William Tandy Senter (1801-1848), American politician